Rougui tea (pronounced ) is a variety of the tea plant, commonly grown in the Wuyi Mountains and processed into oolong tea. The name literally means "cassia". The tea can be difficult to prepare, but its distinctive sweet aroma can be brought out up to 7 steepings. It was first developed during the Qing dynasty.

This tea may be traditionally processed producing a dark dry leaf and a rich smell or processed according to new consumer standards, giving it a leaf of mixed color and a more fruity aroma.

References

Rou Gui on Babelcarp
Pu'er Tea Benefits

Wuyi tea
Oolong tea
Chinese teas
Chinese tea grown in Fujian
Cultivars of tea grown in China